Calliteara nandarivatu is a moth of the subfamily Lymantriinae. It was described by Robinson in 1968. It is found on Fiji.

References

Moths described in 1968
Lymantriinae
Moths of Fiji